State Highway 17 (SH-17) is a state highway connecting the cities of Bangalore and Mysore in the south Indian state of Karnataka. It was built and maintained by the Karnataka Road Development Corporation Limited and inaugurated in 2003. The highway passes through the towns of Ramanagara, Channapatna, Maddur, Mandya and Srirangapatna (Seringapattinam), before entering Mysore. The road is dual carriageway and passes over the Kaveri river. The 15 km stretch from Bangalore Central to Kengeri NICE Road Junction is known as Mysore Road.

The  Bangalore-Maddur section was upgraded under build-operate-transfer (Annuity) basis by a consortium of NCC Infra and Maytas Infra. The  Maddur-Mysore stretch was upgraded by Soma under an EPC contract.

Bengaluru-Mysore highway is being upgraded to 10 lane and given status of "NH-275" .

See also 
 List of State Highways in Karnataka
 NICE Road
 Outer Ring Road, Bangalore
 Mysore Ring Road

References

External links

State Highways in Karnataka
Roads in Ramanagara district
Roads in Mandya district
Roads in Bangalore Rural district
Roads in Mysore district